Beach volleyball competitions at the 2022 South American Youth Games in Rosario, Argentina were held from 28 April to 1 May 2022 at the Estadio Arena in the La Rural cluster.

Two medal events were scheduled to be contested, a men's and a women's tournament. A total of 48 athletes (24 per gender and 12 teams per event) are scheduled to compete. Only athletes born between 1 January 2004 and 31 December 2007 were eligible to compete in each event.

Schedule

Participating nations
A total of 11 nations registered athletes for the beach volleyball event. Each nation was able to enter a maximum of 4 athletes (one team of two athletes per gender). As host nation, Argentina was able to register an extra team per gender in order to complete 12 teams in each tournament.

Medal summary
A total of four nations won medals, with Brazil and Paraguay winning the men's and women's tournaments respectively.

Medal table

Medalists

References

External links
Rosario 2022 Beach Volleyball

South American Youth Games
South American Youth Games
Beach volleyball
2022 South American Youth Games